David "Dave" Redfearn (born 1951) is an English former professional World Cup winning rugby league footballer who played in the 1970s and 1980s.

Background
David Redfearn's birth was registered in Dewsbury district, West Riding of Yorkshire, England.

Playing career

International honours
Dave Redfearn won caps for England while at Bradford Northern in 1975 against France, in the 1975 Rugby League World Cup against Australia, and won caps for Great Britain while at Bradford Northern in the 1972 Rugby League World Cup against New Zealand (sub), and in 1974 against France (2 matches), Australia, and New Zealand (3 matches).

He toured with the 1974 Great Britain Lions, playing in all three Tests against New Zealand and one against Australia.

Challenge Cup Final appearances
Dave Redfearn played , i.e. number 5, in Bradford Northern's 14-33 defeat by Featherstone Rovers in the 1973 Challenge Cup Final during the 1972–73 season at Wembley Stadium, London on Saturday 12 May 1973, in front of a crowd of 72,395.

County Cup Final appearances
Dave Redfearn played , i.e. number 5, in Bradford Northern's 18-8 victory over York in the 1978–79 Yorkshire County Cup Final during the 1978–79 season at Headingley Rugby Stadium, Leeds on Saturday 28 October 1978, and played as an interchange/substitute, i.e. number 14, (replacing  Phil Sanderson) in the 5-10 defeat by Castleford in the 1981–82 Yorkshire County Cup Final during the 1981–82 season at Headingley Rugby Stadium, Leeds on Saturday 3 October 1981.

Player's No.6 Trophy Final appearances
Dave Redfearn played , i.e. number 5, in Bradford Northern's 3-2 victory over Widnes in the 1974–75 Player's No.6 Trophy Final during the 1974–75 season at Wilderspool Stadium, Warrington on Saturday 25 January 1975, and played right-, i.e. number 3, in the 6-0 victory over Widnes in the 1979–80 Player's No.6 Trophy Final during the 1979–80 season at Headingley Rugby Stadium, Leeds on Saturday 5 January 1980.

Genealogical information
David Redfearn is the older brother of the rugby league footballer; Alan Redfearn.

References

External links
Photograph "Pre-season 1976–77" at rlhp.co.uk
Photograph "Smiling Dave Redfearn" at rlhp.co.uk
Photograph "Dave Redfearn scores" at rlhp.co.uk
Photograph "Dave Redfearn scores" at rlhp.co.uk
Photograph "Let's celebrate" at rlhp.co.uk
Photograph "Santa unmasked" at rlhp.co.uk
Photograph "David Redf(f)earn "scores"" at rlhp.co.uk
Photograph "Redfearn sneaks in" at rlhp.co.uk
Photograph "Alan Redfearn goes over" at rlhp.co.uk
Photograph "Team photo 1978" at rlhp.co.uk
Photograph "Ronnie Firth sprays the champagne"  (Upside-down) at rlhp.co.uk
Photograph "Northern celebrate the Championship win" at rlhp.co.uk
Photograph "Ernest Ward holds the Championship Trophy" at rlhp.co.uk
Photograph "The Mayor shows off the Trophy" (Upside-down) at rlhp.co.uk
Photograph "Keith goes over" at rlhp.co.uk
Photograph "David Redfearn stretches out to score" at rlhp.co.uk
Photograph "David Redfearn takes one in the face" at rlhp.co.uk
Photograph "1981 team v. Hull" at rlhp.co.uk
Photograph "Daylight training" at rlhp.co.uk
Photograph "Not this time David" at rlhp.co.uk
Photograph "Seabourne leads his men" at rlhp.co.uk
Photograph "Delighted Northern players with the cup" at rlhp.co.uk
Photograph "David Redfearn on the break" at rlhp.co.uk
Photograph "Watson scores" at rlhp.co.uk
Photograph "Determined Ian Slater" at rlhp.co.uk
Photograph "Redfearn makes a break" at rlhp.co.uk
Photograph "Joe Phillips memorial trophy team 1975" at rlhp.co.uk
Photograph "Farrar stopped" at rlhp.co.uk
Photograph "David Redfearn dives over" at rlhp.co.uk
Photograph "The team ready to leave" at rlhp.co.uk
Photograph "The teams take to the field" at rlhp.co.uk
Photograph "Meeting Mountbatten" at rlhp.co.uk
Photograph "The National Anthem" at rlhp.co.uk
Photograph "Semi Final winners" at rlhp.co.uk
Photograph "Hardisty back flip" at rlhp.co.uk
Photograph "Redfearn goes over in the snow" at rlhp.co.uk

1951 births
Living people
Bradford Bulls players
England national rugby league team players
English rugby league players
Great Britain national rugby league team players
Rugby league players from Dewsbury
Rugby league wingers